Oskar Amberg (29 December 1878 – 24 October 1963 Lübeck, West Germany) was an Estonian politician.

Political offices:
 1923–1924 Minister of Labour and Welfare
 1924 Minister of War
 1925–1926 Minister of Roads

References

1878 births
1963 deaths
People from Nõo Parish
People from Kreis Dorpat
Estonian Lutherans
Christian People's Party (Estonia) politicians
Government ministers of Estonia
Defence Ministers of Estonia
Members of the Riigikogu, 1920–1923
Members of the Riigikogu, 1923–1926
Russian military personnel of the Russo-Japanese War
Russian military personnel of World War I
Estonian military personnel of the Estonian War of Independence
Estonian World War II refugees
Estonian emigrants to Germany